Ashley Weinhold and Caitlin Whoriskey were the defending champions, but chose not to participate.

Desirae Krawczyk and Giuliana Olmos won the title, defeating Jovana Jakšić and Vera Lapko in the final, 6–1, 6–2.

Seeds

Draw

References
Main Draw

FSP Gold River Women's Challenger - Doubles
FSP Gold River Women's Challenger